Lontong sayur (lit. vegetable rice cake) is an Indonesian traditional rice dish made of pieces of lontong served in coconut milk soup with shredded chayote, tempeh, tofu, hard-boiled egg, sambal and krupuk. Lontong sayur is related and quite similar to ketupat sayur and is a favourite breakfast menu next to bubur ayam and nasi uduk. The dish is found in Betawi and Minangkabau cuisine.

See also

Lontong
Arem-arem
Lontong balap
Lontong cap go meh
Lontong dekem
Lontong kari

References

Indonesian rice dishes
Betawi cuisine